Milton Wagner Jr. (born February 20, 1963) is an American basketball coach and former professional basketball player. After playing college basketball at Louisville, Wagner played in the National Basketball Association (NBA). He served as assistant coach for the UTEP Miners and the Auburn Tigers.

Biography
Wagner played high school basketball at Camden High School.

A 6' 5" point guard/shooting guard he led the Louisville Cardinals to the 1986 NCAA Championship along with three Final Four berths (1982, 1983, 1986) as well as to the 1984 Sweet Sixteen.  He helped the Cardinals to a 113–32 record, three Metro Conference regular season titles and two Metro Conference Tournament crowns during his college career. He redshirted the 1985 season with a broken foot.

A three-time All-Metro Conference selection, Wagner ranks fifth (was fourth after finishing collegiate career) in Cardinal history with 1,836 career points, with a 12.7 career scoring average while also averaging 3.0 assists and 2.5 rebounds. He played in 144 career games, second all-time at Louisville, and started the last 111 games he played. He ranks sixth in career assists (432) and seventh in career free throw percentage (.808, 336-of-413).

Wagner was drafted in the second round of the 1986 NBA Draft. Wagner is one of the few players that have won national titles in high school, college and in the NBA. He and Billy Thompson are the only players to win all three championships as teammates.

Wagner is also the father of Janay Wagner and former NBA player Dajuan Wagner and the grandfather of Dajuan Wagner Jr. He served as an assistant men's basketball coach for the University of Texas at El Paso under Tony Barbee. In 2010, he moved to Auburn as part of Barbee's staff there.

References

External links
Career Stats
Profile at basket.co.il

1963 births
Living people
American expatriate basketball people in France
American expatriate basketball people in Germany
American expatriate basketball people in Israel
American men's basketball players
Auburn Tigers men's basketball coaches
Basketball players from Camden, New Jersey
Basketball players from New Jersey
Bayer Giants Leverkusen players
Camden High School (New Jersey) alumni
Dallas Mavericks draft picks
Hapoel Holon players
Hapoel Tel Aviv B.C. players
Ironi Ramat Gan players
Israeli Basketball Premier League players
Los Angeles Lakers players
Louisville Cardinals men's basketball players
McDonald's High School All-Americans
Miami Heat players
Parade High School All-Americans (boys' basketball)
Paris Racing Basket players
Point guards
Quad City Thunder players
Rapid City Thrillers players
Shooting guards
UTEP Miners men's basketball coaches